Hiram Bithorn Stadium (Spanish: Estadio Hiram Bithorn) is a baseball park in San Juan, Puerto Rico, built in 1962 and designed by Puerto Rican architect Pedro Miranda. It is operated by the municipal government of the city of San Juan. Its name honors the first Puerto Rican to play in the major leagues, Hiram Bithorn, who first played with the Chicago Cubs in 1942. Built in 1962, under the mayoral administration of Felisa Rincón de Gautier, replacing Estadio Sixto Escobar, the stadium is home to the Santurce Crabbers, of the Puerto Rico Baseball League. It was added to the National Register of Historic Places in 2014.

Dimensions 
The stadium has approximately 18,000 seats. The stadium is 325 feet (99 m) down the left-field line, 325 feet (99 m) down the right-field line and 404 feet (123 m) to center field. The fences are 8 feet (2.5 m) high. When the Expos played home games at Hiram Bithorn, the field dimensions were set to match Olympic Stadium in Montreal.

History 
The first outdoor National Basketball Association game was played between the Phoenix Suns and the Milwaukee Bucks on September 24, 1972, during that year's preseason. The Suns defeated the Bucks, 116–103.

In the mid-1990s Hiram Bithorn Stadium was planned to be the home of the yet-to-be-named Puerto Rico team, a charter franchise of the United League (UL) which was a planned third league of Major League Baseball (MLB).

The stadium hosted Major League Baseball's Opening Day Game in 2001, in which the Toronto Blue Jays faced the Texas Rangers in an American League match-up. However, 4,000 who bought tickets were turned away when the police determined the safe capacity of the park had been vastly exceeded.

It was the object of a major overhaul under the mayoral administration of Jorge Santini, before becoming the part-time home of the Montreal Expos of the National League in 2003 and 2004 before their move to Washington, D.C. as the Washington Nationals. The Expos played 20 "home" games across the two seasons as a result of poor attendance at their home Olympic Stadium in Montreal. Before Major League Baseball's announcement of the Montreal Expos' move to Washington, Puerto Rico and San Juan made an effort to lure the Expos franchise to the island territory permanently.

Hiram Bithorn Stadium hosted parts of the first two rounds of the 2006 World Baseball Classic. Pool C, which included the teams of Puerto Rico, Cuba, Panama, and the Netherlands, was played there. It also hosted Pool 2 of the second round of the Classic which featured Cuba, Puerto Rico, the Dominican Republic, and Venezuela, the top two finishers from Pool C and Pool D. Pool D games of the 2009 World Baseball Classic were played there between March 7 and March 11, 2009. The Hiram Bithorn Stadium hosted the 2013 World Baseball Classic with Puerto Rico, Venezuela, the Dominican Republic and newcomers Spain in Pool C.

In 2008, it served as the stadium for Atléticos de San Juan and Academia Quintana, two soccer teams in the Puerto Rico Soccer League, Puerto Rico's first-ever professional soccer league.

In 2010, Major League Baseball returned to the stadium, as the Florida Marlins faced the New York Mets in a three-game series during the regular season.

The Marlins were to play the Pittsburgh Pirates on May 30 and 31, 2016 in honor of Roberto Clemente Day. However, on May 6, 2016, it was announced that the Puerto Rico games would be postponed due to the Zika virus outbreak, and moved to Marlins Park.

The Cleveland Indians and Minnesota Twins played a two-game series at Hiram Bithorn Stadium on April 17 and 18, 2018. It is the first time since 2010 that a Major League Baseball regular-season game was played in Puerto Rico. Furthermore, the league announced in August 2019 that they would be returning for a three-game series in April 2020 between the Miami Marlins and New York Mets. This series was later cancelled as a result of the COVID-19 pandemic.

There have been, as of June 2020, 71 professional boxing events that have been held at the stadium, including many world championship fights. Also, former world heavyweight champion Floyd Patterson fought there late in his career.

Other uses 
Along with sporting events, the stadium has hosted concerts by many famous artists.

Metallica were scheduled to perform during their Nowhere Else to Roam Tour on April 28, 1993, but it was rained out and never rescheduled.

Shakira has performed twice, during her Tour Anfibio, on April 9, 2000, and during the Tour of the Mongoose, on March 22, 2003.

Some of the concerts that have been held at the venue:
 The Byrds – April 30, 1967
 Santana – October 31, 1971
 The Jackson Five – July 17, 1973
 Blue Angel/Peter Frampton – August 22, 1981
 Blue Öyster Cult – October 28, 1983
 Bon Jovi/Scorpions: Love At First Sting Tour – July 13, 1984
 Black Jack/Ozzy Osbourne: Bark At The Moon Tour – August 4, 1984
 The Motels/Men At Work – August 2, 1985
 Sting – November 9, 1985
 Cinderella/Bon Jovi: Slippery When Wet Tour – February 21, 1987
 The Beach Boys – April 4, 1987
 Poison/Ratt: Dancing Undercover Tour – June 12, 1987
 Toto/Rod Stewart: Out of Order Tour – July 1, 1988
 Stryper: In God We Trust Tour – January 14, 1989
 Gloria Estefan: Into The Light Tour - March 14 & 15, 1992
 Whitney Houston: The Bodyguard World Tour – April 24, 1994
 Phil Collins: Both Sides Tour – April 29, 1995
 Laura Pausini: World Wide Tour – May 10, 1997
 Billy Joel – February 11, 1999
 Maná: Unplugged – May 6, 2000
 Backstreet Boys – May 19 & 20, 2001 - Black & Blue Tour
 Mega Electronic Fest: March 19, 2011, March 17, 2012, and March 16, 2013
 Rihanna: Diamonds World Tour – October 29, 2013
 Bad Bunny: P FKN R – December 10–11, 2021
 Daddy Yankee: La Última Vuelta World Tour – January 6–8, 2023 (last concerts of Daddy Yankee's career)

Professional Wrestling:
 WWC Anniversary Show 1984: September 14, 1984. Attendance 34,383.
 WWF – October 19, 1985

See also

 National Register of Historic Places listings in metropolitan San Juan, Puerto Rico

References

External links 
 Ballparks.com: Hiram Bithorn Stadium
 MLB.com: List of MLB games at Hiram Bithorn Stadium
 Clem's Baseball Hiram Bithorn Stadium
 Hiram Bithorn Stadium Aerial View
 

Sports venues in San Juan, Puerto Rico
Puerto Rico
Baseball venues in Puerto Rico
Multi-purpose stadiums in the United States
Event venues on the National Register of Historic Places in Puerto Rico
National Register of Historic Places in San Juan, Puerto Rico
Defunct Major League Baseball venues
Football venues in Puerto Rico
Montreal Expos stadiums
Pan American Games opening ceremony stadiums
World Baseball Classic venues
Sports venues completed in 1963
1963 establishments in Puerto Rico
Sports venues on the National Register of Historic Places
Modernist architecture in Puerto Rico